The Kezilesu Group is a geological formation in China whose strata date back to the Early Cretaceous. Dinosaur remains are among the fossils that have been recovered from the formation.

Vertebrate paleofauna
 Psittacosaurus sp.

See also

 List of dinosaur-bearing rock formations

References

Geologic groups of Asia
Geologic formations of China
Lower Cretaceous Series of Asia